The 2020 Emperor's Cup Final was the final of the 100th edition of the Emperor's Cup, the 2020 Emperor's Cup.

The match was contested at the newly rebuilt Japan National Stadium in Tokyo.

The J1 League champions Kawasaki Frontale completed the double by beating the league's runners-up Gamba Osaka 1–0 in the final, earning their first Emperor's Cup title.

Teams

Road to the final

Format 
The final was played as a single match. If tied after regulation time, extra time and, if necessary, a penalty shoot-out would have been used to decide the winning team.

Match

Lineups

References 

Emperor's Cup
2020 in Japanese football
Kawasaki Frontale matches
Gamba Osaka matches
2020 in Asian football
2020 in Japanese sport
Emperors Cup Final, 2020